Rita Akaffou (born 5 December 1986) is an Ivorian professional footballer , who plays for  Fatih Karagümrük in the Turkish Women's Super League. 
She was part of the Ivorian squad.

Club career
Akaffou played for the Cypriot team Barcelona FA before she transferred to Pyrgos Limassol F.C.

She moved to Turkey, and joined the newly established club Fatih Karagümrük to playe in the Women's Sıper League.

International career
She was part of the Ivorian squad for the 2015 FIFA Women's World Cup.

See also
List of Ivory Coast women's international footballers

References

External links
 
 Profile at FIF 

1986 births
Living people
Ivorian women's footballers
Ivory Coast women's international footballers
Women's association football midfielders
2015 FIFA Women's World Cup players
Gintra Universitetas players
Ivorian expatriate footballers
Ivorian expatriates in Lithuania
Expatriate women's footballers in Lithuania
Ivorian expatriate sportspeople in Cyprus
Expatriate women's footballers in Cyprus
Barcelona FA players
Ivorian expatriate sportspeople in Turkey
Expatriate women's footballers in Turkey
Fatih Karagümrük S.K. (women's football) players
Turkish Women's Football Super League players